Ed West is a British author, journalist and blogger, who is the deputy editor of UnHerd. He was previously deputy editor of The Catholic Herald and a columnist for The Daily Telegraph and The Spectator. He began his career with the lads mag Nuts Magazine, and has also written for the Evening Standard, The Guardian, The i, The Week, and Spiked.

He is the son of British journalist Richard West and Irish journalist Mary Kenny and the brother of the journalist Patrick West.

While working at men's magazines, West wrote a number of short humour books, including one called How to Pull Women (2006), which he later described on his blog for The Daily Telegraph as "embarrassing."

West's book, The Diversity Illusion, which examines the adverse effects of mass immigration on British society, was published in April 2013. Reviewing the book, Peter Oborne described West as "one of the most interesting of the rising generation of political writers, who delights in destroying liberal pieties." Oborne also said "At its worst, though, West's book can come over as an anti-Islamic rant." The Observer described the book as a "brazen and breezily written polemic" whose "arguments are repeatedly undermined by reality." The Sunday Times included the book in their list of "Political Books of the Year". The book's 2015 reissue was chosen as one of The Sunday Times'''s Political Books of the Year.

West's 2020 book Small Men on the Wrong Side of History focuses on the failures of post-war conservativism.

Books The Little Book of Asbos (Crombie Jardine, 2005) Don't Mention the World Cup (Summersdale, 2006) Male Grooming (Summdersale, 2006)How to Pull Women: The Science of Seduction (Summersdale, 2006) The Diversity Illusion (Gibson Square Books Ltd, 2013) The Silence of Our Friends (2014)The Realm: The True history behind Game of Thrones1215 and All That: Magna Carta and King John (Skyhorse Publishing, 2017) Saxons vs. Vikings: Alfred the Great and England in the Dark Ages (Skyhorse Publishing, 2017) 1066 and Before All That: The Battle of Hastings, Anglo-Saxon and Norman England (Skyhorse Publishing, 2017) England in the Age of Chivalry . . . And Awful Diseases: The Hundred Years' War and Black Death (Skyhorse Publishing, 2018) My Kingdom for a Horse: The War of the Roses (A Very, Very Short History of England) (Skyhorse Publishing, 2018) The Path of the Martyrs: Charles Martel, The Battle of Tours and the Birth of Europe (Sharpe Books, 2019) Iron, Fire, and Ice: The Real History that Inspired Game of Thrones (Skyhorse Publishing, 2019) Tory Boy: Memoirs of the Last Conservative (Little, Brown and Company, 2020)  Originally published as Small Men on the Wrong Side of History''

References

External links
 

21st-century English male writers
21st-century Roman Catholics
British male bloggers
British social commentators
Critics of multiculturalism
English bloggers
English people of Irish descent
English political writers
English Roman Catholics
Living people
Online journalists
Pickup artists
The Daily Telegraph people
Year of birth missing (living people)